Exomiocarpon is a genus of flowering plants in the family Asteraceae.

There is only one known species, Exomiocarpon madagascariense, endemic to Madagascar.

References

Heliantheae
Monotypic Asteraceae genera
Endemic flora of Madagascar